Anilton may refer to:
 Anílton da Conceição (born 1968), Brazilian footballer
 Anilton (footballer) (born 1980), Brazilian footballer